Elachista cornutifera is a moth in the family Elachistidae. It was described by Sruoga in 1995. It is found in the Russian Far East.

References

Moths described in 1995
cornutifera
Moths of Asia